86 Armoured Regiment is an armoured regiment of the Indian Army.

Formation 
The regiment was raised on 1 March 1977 by Lt Col N.S. Malik (later Lt Gen) at Ahmednagar as an all India mixed-class regiment and was equipped with T-55 tanks.

History 
The regiment was involved in Operation Blue Star from 6 August to 9 September 1984. It later participated in Operation Trident, Operation Vijay and Operation Parakram. It has also participated in counter-infiltration and counter-terrorist operations.

The Regiment was presented the ‘President’s Standards’ at Mamun Cantonment near Pathankot on 1 December 2003 by the President of India, Mr A. P. J. Abdul Kalam.

The Regiment had the honour of participating in the Republic Day parade in 2020.

Equipment
The regiment was raised with T-55 tanks and subsequently converted to T-90 tanks.

Notable personnel
Lt Gen N.S. Malik : First Commandant and later Deputy Chief of Army Staff
 Lt Gen Kamal Davar : The third Commandant,  GOC of 3 Infantry Division, GOC of the XI Corps, Director-General, Mechanised Forces, the first chief of Defence Intelligence Agency.
Maj Gen RS Malve : He was the Commandant when the regiment received the President's Standards in 2003. 
Risaldar Major Mohd. Ayub Khan, Vir Chakra (Honorary Captain) : Formerly of the 18th Cavalry, he was the first Risaldar Major of the Regiment. He rose to be a Minister of State in Prime Minister P. V. Narasimha Rao's government.

Regimental Insignia

The regiment initially had a cap badge consisting of crossed lances with pennons, the Ashoka Lion Capital above and the numeral "86" inscribed on the crossing of the lances. It was amended in 1990 and the Lion Capital was replaced with the "mailed fist" or gauntlet. A scroll was added at the base with the regimental motto inscribed in Devanagari script on it.

The motto of the regiment is 'निश्चय कर अपनी जीत करौं' (Nischay Kar Apni Jeet Karoon) which translates to And with determination, I will be Victorious.  

The shoulder title consists of the numeral "86" in brass.

References

Military units and formations established in 1977
Armoured and cavalry regiments of the Indian Army from 1947